The Werribee Centrals Sports Club is an Australian rules football and netball club based in the suburb of Werribee, Victoria. The club teams currently compete in the Geelong & District Football League, where the football squad joined in 1984.

History
The club was formed as the "Werribee Centrals Sports & Youth Club Inc. Club" in 1970 after the amalgamation with the Werribee Football Club was disbanded. It was originally just a senior Football club which joined the now disbanded Western Suburbs League in 1970. Centrals colours at the time were the Black & Yellow   colours.

After winning three consecutive premierships in first division in the Western Suburbs League the club moved to the Geelong & District Football League and play under the VCFL Banner. In the very first year after joining the Geelong Competition, Centrals won both Senior and Reserves Premierships in the GDFL Second Division. The club also changed its playing and club colours to Green and Gold. To complete the change the Centrals went from being the Tigers to the Centurions.

Premierships

Reference:

Bibliography
 Cat Country: History of Football In The Geelong Region by John Stoward –

References

External links
 Facebook page
 Teamapp site

Geelong & District Football League clubs
Sports clubs established in 1970
Australian rules football clubs established in 1970
1970 establishments in Australia
Sport in the City of Wyndham
Werribee, Victoria
Netball teams in Melbourne
Australian rules football clubs in Melbourne